The 2008 DFB-Pokal Final decided the winner of the 2007–08 DFB-Pokal, the 65th season of Germany's premier knockout football cup competition. The match took place on 19 April 2008 between thirteen-time winners Bayern München and two-time winners Borussia Dortmund. The final was played in front of 70,000 at Berlin's Olympiastadion. Bayern ran out 2–1 winners in extra time, thanks to two strikes from Italian forward Luca Toni, gaining their 14th DFB-Pokal title and gaining the first trophy of a league and cup double.

Route to the final
The DFB-Pokal began with 64 teams in a single-elimination knockout cup competition. There were a total of five rounds leading up to the final. Teams were drawn against each other, and the winner after 90 minutes would advance. If still tied, 30 minutes of extra time was played. If the score was still level, a penalty shoot-out was used to determine the winner.

Note: In all results below, the score of the finalist is given first (H: home; A: away).

Match

Details

References

External links
 Match report at kicker.de 
 Match report at WorldFootball.net
 Match report at Fussballdaten.de 

2008
2007–08 in German football cups
Borussia Dortmund matches
FC Bayern Munich matches
April 2008 sports events in Europe
2008 in Berlin
Football competitions in Berlin